ESPN3 (formerly ESPN360 and ESPN3.com)  is an online streaming service owned by ESPN Inc., a joint venture between The Walt Disney Company (which operates the network, through its 80% controlling ownership interest) and Hearst Communications (which holds the remaining 20% interest), that provides live streams and replays of global sports events to sports fans in the United States.

History
The use of the name ESPN3 was discussed as early as 1996 for the channel that would eventually become known as ESPNews. The website began in 2005 as ESPN360.com, a mostly on-demand video website. In September 2007, ESPN360.com shifted away from on-demand content such as studio shows and shifted toward placing "emphasis on live events". On April 4, 2010, ESPN360.com re-launched as ESPN3.com. On August 31, 2011, the network became simply known as ESPN3, and was incorporated into the WatchESPN platform, which also carries simulcasts of ESPN, ESPN2, ESPNU, ESPNews, ESPN Deportes, ESPN Goal Line, ESPN Buzzer Beater, SEC Network and Longhorn Network. The following year, most programming from ESPN, ESPN2 or ESPNU that aired during the evening hours, or from 12:00 p.m. local time onward on weekends, was removed from ESPN3; such programs are no longer available live on ESPN3 except for alternate camera angles and Spanish language dubs that do not air on ESPN Deportes. Most sporting events that air on the WatchESPN platform live, even if they originally aired on ESPN, ESPN2 or ESPNU, are available on-demand from ESPN3 after the event ends for a period of up to 30 days (exceptions as of 2016 include games from the Southeastern Conference and Atlantic Coast Conference, both of which require TV Everywhere logins through WatchESPN). In April 2017, the site was given an aesthetic upgrade to match the rest of ESPN's Internet offerings.

Beginning with the launch of subscription over-the-top content service ESPN+ in April 2018, a substantial number of programs that had previously been available on ESPN3 have been paywalled and now require an ESPN+ subscription (although, unlike ESPN3, ESPN+ is a separate service which does not require the user to be an ESPN subscriber). In 2019, a third level of online content, totally free without the requirement for subscription to either ESPN+ or a cable provider, was added, branded as @ESPN; @ESPN content consists mostly of the show Fantasy Focus and some press conferences (such as the XFL team name and logo reveals).

Description
As of 2023, ESPN3 broadcasts are mostly events that air over-the-air on ABC, alternate camera angles of programming airing in simulcast on one of the linear networks (see ESPN Megacast), panorama coverage of multiple courts (in the case of bracket tournaments, especially for major tennis tournaments), Spanish dubs not carried on ESPN Deportes, and a limited amount of exclusive college sports programming, mostly from smaller colleges and universities.

In contrast to WatchESPN and other TV Everywhere services, access to ESPN3 from computers is automatically determined by assessing the incoming IP address. Those accessing from outside their usual network or from a mobile device can (and must) use their TV Everywhere login to access ESPN3 content.

Availability
In the United States, the network is available to individuals who receive their high-speed Internet connection or cable television subscription from an affiliated service provider. Since 2008, ESPN3 has also been available to approximately 21 million U.S. college students and U.S.-based military personnel via computers with college/university (.edu) and U.S. military (.mil) IP addresses. ESPN3 is only available to Internet providers who pay fees to ESPN. ESPN3 is not carried by traditional cable and satellite providers, as it is not a single channel, but streams multiple live events at the same time; however, ESPN includes a listing for a linear "ESPN3" channel (which only includes one event at a time) in the television listings on its website. As part of the wide-ranging distribution agreement that DirecTV and The Walt Disney Company announced, ESPN3 was made available to DirecTV customers in early 2015. In December 2016, ESPN started the nationwide rollout of the ESPN App on DirecTV set top boxes in five states, which allows customers to stream thousands of live events from ESPN3 on their DirecTV set top boxes. The nationwide rollout was completed in February 2017.

On November 1, 2010, ESPN3 launched on Xbox Live. This service allows Xbox Live members to access live sporting events on ESPN3, among other offerings, at no additional cost. At launch, Xbox Live Gold membership was required to access the ESPN app; however, with the June 2014 update to Xbox Live, Gold membership is no longer required to access ESPN on Xbox 360 or Xbox One. Dish Network added ESPN3 in April 2014. In September 2016, ESPN3 was made available on over-the-top online video service Sling TV.

Criticism
Some internet service providers have complained to the FCC that ESPN3 (along with other services that use the TV Everywhere system) violates the principles of network neutrality. ESPN3 bundles its content into the fees of the participating ISP, regardless of whether or not users partake in accessing its content. If a particular ISP does not pay subscription fees to ESPN, users of that ISP are not granted access to ESPN3. There is no way for individual users to overcome these access restrictions as ESPN3 does not provide subscription options for individual users or any other non-ISP entities, and because most ISPs operate in specific territories without competition, a subscriber cannot access ESPN3 unless a participating ISP actually operates in the area. ESPN's only recommended solution in such a situation is to have the consumer lobby an ISP that is available in their area to add ESPN3.

RCN does not allow internet-only and basic cable subscribers to access ESPN3; only those who subscribe to a standard cable tier or higher (and thus access ESPN's linear networks) can use the service. Thus, in these cases the cost of the service is bundled into the cable bill and not the Internet bill.

References

External links
 ESPN3 on WatchESPN
 List of ESPN3 affiliated Internet Service Providers in the United States
 List of ESPN3 affiliated Video Service Providers in the United States
 Time Warner Cable ESPN3 FAQ page

ESPN media outlets
Internet television channels
College basketball on television in the United States
College football on television